= Trinetix, Inc. =

Trinetix
- Company type: Private
- Industry: Software engineering; Software development; Information technology
- Founded: 2011
- Headquarters: Nashville, Tennessee, U.S.
- Area served: North America; Europe; Middle East
- Number of employees: 1,200 (2025)
- Website: www.trinetix.com

Trinetix, Inc. is a technological consultancy specializing in digital consulting services and enterprise software development. Headquartered in the United States, Trinetix has delivery centers in Ukraine, Poland, and Argentina, and offices in Spain, Portugal, Germany, Bulgaria, Poland and Romania.

== History ==
Trinetix was founded in 2011 by a group of technology professionals with Ukrainian roots, headed by Oleksandr Strozhemin. Initially, the company was focused on augmented reality (AR), experience design, and mobile app development. During this period, the company delivered over 20 AR projects for major global brands such as Procter & Gamble, Nivea, ExxonMobil, Ray-Ban, and Coca-Cola. In 2012, Trinetix won a competitive RFP and was part of a Big Four leader’s partner ecosystem, playing a major role in developing and executing the design-led approach that became the Big Four leader’s trademark product development framework.

In 2023, Trinetix merged with Nashville-based company Emergest. Also in 2023, Trinetix raised $10 million from Hypra Fund. In 2024, Trinetix opened a new delivery center in Buenos Aires, Argentina.
